The Safe House is a 1975 novel written by Australian author Jon Cleary about the fate of Jews and Nazis after World War II.

References

External links
The novel was serialised in four parts in The Australian Women's Weekly – Part 1, Part 2, Part 3, Part 4
The Safe House at AustLit (subscription required)

1975 Australian novels
Novels first published in serial form
Novels about Nazis
William Collins, Sons books
William Morrow and Company books
Novels by Jon Cleary
Novels about the aftermath of the Holocaust